KZUP-CD (channel 20) is a low-power, Class A independent television station in Baton Rouge, Louisiana, United States. It is owned by Nexstar Media Group alongside Fox affiliate WGMB-TV (channel 44) and CW owned-and-operated station WBRL-CD (channel 21); Nexstar also provides certain services to NBC affiliate WVLA-TV (channel 33) under joint sales and shared services agreements (JSA/SSA) with owner White Knight Broadcasting. The stations share studios on Perkins Road in Baton Rouge, while KZUP-CD's transmitter is located near Addis, Louisiana.

While "KZUP-CD" is the station's official call sign, it uses "KZUP-TV" for promotional purposes.

History
The station signed on the air in 1999 as a WZUP, a UPN affiliate available only on cable (TCI and later Cox channel 13). It was the second UPN affiliate (of three) in the Baton Rouge area. When the station went over the air on November 26, 2002, it changed its call sign to KZUP-CA; originally it was going to air on channel 21 and WB affiliate WBRL-CA was on channel 19, but this assignment was short-lived. Channel 19 was once used as a translator station for local station and original UPN affiliate WBTR, and when KZUP went on the air, WBTR moved to previously-unused channel 41. It became an independent station after losing UPN to Raycom Media's WBXH-CA in 2003. As an independent, it called itself "Z-19," and it primarily aired African-American-oriented programming like Good Times, The Fresh Prince of Bel-Air, and The Jeffersons. For brief periods in 2005, KZUP was used to simulcast WVLA and WGMB over analog as their individual transmitter towers were turned off to allow upgrades for their digital television channels. KZUP became an affiliate of the Retro Television Network on September 15, 2008. In 2012, White Knight Broadcasting dropped RTN and resumed carrying syndicated programming.

On April 24, 2013, Communications Corporation of America announced the sale of its entire group to Nexstar Broadcasting Group. WVLA and KZUP were to be sold to Mission Broadcasting, but on August 13, 2014, Mission withdrew its application. The sale was completed on January 1, 2015. Nexstar would continue to operate WVLA and KZUP under a shared services agreement, with sister stations WGMB and WBRL.

KZUP was the official station of the Southern University athletic department.

On January 4, 2016, Nexstar agreed to exercise its option to purchase KZUP-CD. Nexstar also decided to enter KZUP-CD into the FCC's broadcast incentive auction, but the station's spectrum was never sold. The sale was approved by the FCC on February 19 and completed on March 17.

On December 3, 2018, Nexstar announced it would acquire the assets of Chicago-based Tribune Media for $6.4 billion in cash and debt. The deal—which would make Nexstar the largest television station operator by total number of stations upon its expected closure late in the third quarter of 2019—would give the KZUP/WBRL/WGMB/WVLA virtual quadropoly sister stations in Tribune's legal duopoly of ABC affiliate WGNO and CW affiliate WNOL-TV in New Orleans.  On July 1, 2020, KZUP began channel sharing with WBRL and upgraded its feed to high definition. Since then, KZUP and WBRL both broadcast on channel 20, but KZUP's channel is mapped to 20.1, and WBRL's to channel 21.1.

Programming
Syndicated programming on KZUP-CD includes Family Guy, Seinfeld, America's Court with Judge Ross, Supreme Justice with Judge Karen, The Simpsons and Cheaters, among others. The station is known for its afternoon court block, which airs from 1 p.m. to 5:30 p.m. each weekday. KZUP also reairs WVLA's 10 p.m. newscast at 11 p.m., and the 5–7 a.m. newscast from 8–10 a.m.

Subchannel

References

External links

Independent television stations in the United States
Television stations in Baton Rouge, Louisiana
Television channels and stations established in 1999
1999 establishments in Louisiana
Low-power television stations in the United States
Nexstar Media Group